The UK Singles Chart is one of many music charts compiled by the Official Charts Company that calculates the best-selling singles of the week in the United Kingdom. Before 2004, the chart was only based on the sales of physical singles. This list shows singles that peaked in the Top 10 of the UK Singles Chart during 1996, as well as singles which peaked in 1995 but were in the top 10 in 1996. The entry date is when the single appeared in the top 10 for the first time (week ending, as published by the Official Charts Company, which is six days after the chart is announced).

One-hundred and ninety-five singles were in the top ten in 1996. Nine singles from 1995 remained in the top 10 for several weeks at the beginning of the year. "I Am Blessed" by Eternal was the only single from 1995 to reach its peak in 1996. Forty-nine artists scored multiple entries in the top 10 in 1996. Backstreet Boys, The Chemical Brothers, Faithless, Lighthouse Family and Spice Girls were among the many artists who achieved their first UK charting top 10 single in 1996.

The 1995 Christmas number-one, "Earth Song" by Michael Jackson, remained at number-one for the first two weeks of 1996. The first new number-one single of the year was "Jesus to a Child" by George Michael. Overall, twenty-four different singles peaked at number-one in 1996, with Spice Girls (3) having the most singles hit that position.

Background

Multiple entries
One-hundred and ninety-five singles charted in the top 10 in 1996, with one-hundred and eighty-seven singles reaching their peak this year.

Forty-nine artists scored multiple entries in the top 10 in 1996. Boyzone, Celine Dion, Eternal, Manic Street Preachers, Mark Morrison and Michael Jackson shared the record for the most top ten singles in 1996 with four hit singles each. Two of Boyzone's singles reached number-one: the Bee Gees cover "Words" in October and their album title track "A Different Beat" in December. The other hits were "Father and Son", which reached number 2 at the end of 1995, and "Coming Home Now", which charted at number 4 in March. Another all-male group, Manic Street Preachers from Wales, had four top ten singles, with the highest charting "A Design for Life" reaching number two in April. Of the other artists, Michael Jackson had a number-one hit with "Earth Song"; Celine Dion peaked at number 3 with "It's All Coming Back to Me Now"; Mark Morrison reached number-one with his signature-song "Return of the Mack" and Eternal's biggest hit was "Someday", which peaked at number 4.

Gina G was one of a number of artists with two top-ten entries, including the number-one single "Ooh Aah...Just a Little Bit". The Beautiful South, Cast, Jamiroquai, Mariah Carey and Suede were among the other artists who had multiple top 10 entries in 1996.

Chart debuts
Seventy-nine artists achieved their first top 10 single in 1996, either as a lead or featured artist. Of these, eight went on to record another hit single that year: Ash, Backstreet Boys, Dr. Dre, Faithless, Garbage, Gina G, Sleeper and Terrorvision. 3T, The Bluetones, Cast, Fugees, Kula Shaker, Ocean Colour Scene and Robert Miles all had a second single make the top ten. Mark Morrison had three other entries in his breakthrough year.

The following table (collapsed on desktop site) does not include acts who had previously charted as part of a group and secured their first top 10 solo single.

Notes
Peter Andre made his top 10 debut with his own single, “Mysterious Girl”, one of three top ten singles in 1996, but the previous year he was part of the Childliners collective who reached number 9 with “The Gift of Christmas”. Goldbug included Richard Walmsley who was a former member of Beatmasters, the production team who debuted in 1987 with "Rok da House". U2's Adam Clayton had appeared on a track outside the group before, the Band Aid charity single "Do They Know It's Christmas" in 1984. However his collaboration with fellow U2 member Larry Mullen Jr. on "Theme from Mission: Impossible" was his official solo top 10 debut.

Wink previously charted under the name Josh Wink but a shortened version was used for the "Higher State of Consciousness" remix. Backstreet Boys appeared on "The Gift of Christmas" charity single in 1995 but "We've Got It Goin' On" was their first entry as a group. Acting and singing duo Ant & Dec had previous chart credits under the name PJ & Duncan, including debut single "Let's Get Ready to Rhumble".

Robbie Williams had left Take That in 1995 and his debut solo single arrived this year, a cover of "Freedom! '90" by George Michael, renamed as "Freedom" and peaking in second spot. Former bandmates Gary Barlow and Mark Owen both launched solo careers in 1996 after the group went on hiatus - Barlow's "Forever Love" topped the chart, with Owen's "Child" reaching number 3.

Dunblane was formed by survivors of the massacre at Dunblane Primary School, with Mark Knopfler of Dire Straits playing guitar on the track. Scottish musician Ted Christopher wrote an extra new verse to "Knockin' on Heaven's Door" honouring the tragedy.

Songs from films
Original songs from various films entered the top 10 throughout the year. These included "The X-Files" (from The X-Files), "Theme from Mission: Impossible" (Mission: Impossible), "Born Slippy .NUXX" (Trainspotting), "Woman" (The Long Kiss Goodnight), "You Must Love Me" and "Don't Cry for Me Argentina" (Evita) and "What's Love Got to Do with It" (Police Story 3: Super Cop).

Charity singles
In the aftermath of the Dunblane massacre, a school shooting in Dunblane, Scotland which claimed the lives of sixteen children and their teacher, surviving students and teachers recorded a tribute single, which included a cover of "Knockin' on Heaven's Door" (which included an extra verse specially written by Ted Christopher) and a new song "Throw These Guns Away". It peaked at number-one on 21 December 1996 (week ending) for a single week.

Best-selling singles
Fugees had the best-selling single of the year with their cover of "Killing Me Softly", which spent eleven weeks in the top 10 (including five weeks at number-one), sold over 1.3 million copies and was certified 2× platinum by the BPI. "Wannabe" by Spice Girls came in second place. Babylon Zoo's "Spaceman", "Say You'll Be There" and "2 Become 1", both by Spice Girls, made up the top five. Songs by Mark Morrison, Baddiel, Skinner & The Lightning Seeds, Gina G, Robert Miles and Peter Andre featuring Bubbler Ranx were also in the top ten best-selling singles of the year.

Top-ten singles
Key

Entries by artist

The following table shows artists who achieved two or more top 10 entries in 1996, including songs that reached their peak in 1995. The figures include both main artists and featured artists, while appearances on ensemble charity records are also counted for each artist.

Notes

 "Missing" originally peaked outside the top ten at number 69 upon its initial release in 1994.
 "Lifted" originally peaked outside the top ten at number 61 upon its initial release in May 1995.
 "Passion" originally peaked outside the top ten at number 29 upon its initial release in 1992.
 "Real Love" was written by John Lennon before his death in 1980. It was recorded by Paul McCartney, George Harrison and Ringo Starr in 1995 and was the last original song by the band to chart.
 "Ooh Aah... Just a Little Bit" was the United Kingdom's entry at the Eurovision Song Contest in 1996.
 "Move Move Move (The Red Tribe)" was released by Manchester United F.C. to celebrate reaching the FA Cup Final in 1996.
 "Pass & Move (It's the Liverpool Groove)" was released by Liverpool F.C. and Boot Room Boyz to celebrate reaching the FA Cup Final in 1996.
 "Three Lions" was released as the official single to support the England football team's participation in UEFA Euro 96.
 "Three Lions" spent one week at number one on 1 June 1996 (week ending) and returned to the top spot on 6 July 1996 (week ending) when England reached the semi-finals of Euro 96.
 "Where Love Lives" originally peaked outside the top ten at number 87 upon its initial release in 1990.
 "Crazy" originally peaked outside the top ten at number 19 upon its initial release in April 1995.
 "Higher State of Consciousness" was re-released in 1996 as a single containing remixes by various DJs and producers. The remixed version was credited to Wink rather Josh Wink.
 Spanish dance song Macarena was named by VH1 in the 2002 documentary series 100 Greatest One-Hit Wonders as the best one-hit wonder of all time.
 Eternal recorded a version of the song "Someday" from the Disney film The Hunchback of Notre Dame which was used on the end credits of the VHS in the UK.
 "We've Got It Goin' On" originally peaked outside the top ten at number 54 upon its initial release in October 1995.
 "Hillbilly Rock Hillbilly Roll" re-entered the top 10 at number 10 on 4 January 1997 (week ending). 
 "Don't Marry Her" re-entered the top 10 at number 10 on 28 December 1996 (week ending).
 Figure includes single that peaked in 1995.
 Figure includes single that first charted in 1995 but peaked in 1996.
 Figure includes appearance on 3T's "Why".
 Figure includes appearance on 2Pac's "California Love".
 Figure includes appearance on Blackstreet's "No Diggity".
 Figure includes appearance on East 17's "If You Ever".
 Figure includes a top 10 hit with the group Take That.

See also
1996 in British music
List of number-one singles from the 1990s (UK)

References
General

Specific

External links
1996 singles chart archive at the Official Charts Company (click on relevant week)
Official Top 40 best-selling songs of 1996 at the Official Charts Company

United Kingdom
Top 10 singles
1996